"Even If You Don't" is a song by the American rock band Ween. It was released in 2000 as the lead single from the album White Pepper. The song was covered by the indie/pop-punk supergroup Two Tongues on their self-titled debut album, released in 2009. It was described as "a flamboyant rocker". "Even If You Don't" was made into a music video directed by the creators of South Park, Trey Parker and Matt Stone.

Formats

Enhanced CD single
Includes the QuickTime video of "Even If You Don't" directed by Matt Stone & Trey Parker of "South Park".

Track listing:
"Even If You Don't"
"Cornbread Red"
"Cornbread Red (dub mix)"

7" Pepper Green Vinyl
Track listing:
"Even If You Don't"
"Cornbread Red"

References

2000 singles
Ween songs
2000 songs
Mushroom Records singles
Songs written by Gene Ween
Songs written by Dean Ween